Michael Sheldon may refer to: 

Michael Sheldon (jurist)
Michael Sheldon (footballer)
Mike Sheldon, American football player